Daphne Pollard (born Daphne Trott; October 19, 1891 – February 22, 1978) was an Australian-born vaudeville performer and dancer, active on stage and later in US films, mostly short comedies.

Diminutive stage star
Born Daphne Trott, in the inner Melbourne suburb of Fitzroy, to Walter William Trott and Annie née Daniels, she joined the Pollard Lilliputian Opera Company at the age of six, having been taken to rehearsals by her older sister, Ivy, who was also a performer. The Pollard company featured performers whose ages ranged from six to sixteen years, playing light opera, operetta and musical comedy (LeCoq, Offenbach, etc.). They toured Australia, New Zealand and the United States in the late nineteenth and early twentieth centuries and were well received and highly acclaimed.

Like many of its performers, Daphne Trott took her stage name from the Pollard company. In later years she claimed she was related to the "cricketing Trotts," presumably meaning famous Australian cricketers Albert Trott and Harry Trott.

Career in the US & UK
Daphne Pollard first arrived in Los Angeles during a company tour in September 1901 and was singled out in enthusiastic reviews. In a November 1903 review, the Los Angeles Herald reported that "Daphne has charm. A full contralto speaking voice, a fine mimicry and good health are her ordinary stock in trade possessions; her delightful small personality is the crown, and makes her every inch a little queen of comic opera." Following further tours of Australia, the company was again in North America from late 1905. By 1907, Pollard was confident and popular enough to strike out on her own. Her Broadway debut was in Eddie Foy's Mr. Hamlet of Broadway in 1908. 

She appeared soon after in The Bohemian Girl at the Los Angeles Theater, at $60 per show. The Los Angeles Times reported that because she was small and not well-developed for her age, Humane Officers thought she was no more than seven. She convinced them that she was actually sixteen.

In October 1908, Pollard appeared with a New York company that performed musical and dramatic shows such as The Thief, The Chorus Lady, The Witching Hour, and Girls, among others. The productions were staged at the Grand Opera House. Among her fellow actors were Harry Macdonough and Charles Halton. Pollard appeared with the Ziegfeld Follies and in Winter Garden Theatre shows. In 1909, she was with a group which entertained at Keith and Proctor's Fifth Avenue Theater.
 
In 1914 Pollard was the petite star of The Girl Behind the Counter at the Morosco Theatre on Broadway (Manhattan). The production also featured actor Al Shean. She followed this success with performances in A Knight for a Day (1915) and The Passing Show of 1915. The latter play was staged at The Mason Theater in Los Angeles and also featured Marilyn Miller.

In 1917, Pollard was in London, where she appeared with English comedian/singer George Robey, playing the role of "She of the Tireless Tongue" in Albert de Courville, Dave Stamper and Gene Buck's lavishly-staged revue Zig-Zag!, which ran for 648 performances at the Hippodrome. She remained with the show when it moved to the Folies Bergère in Paris at the end of the year. She appeared in other successful productions at the Hippodrome, including Box o' Tricks (1918), Joy Bells (1919) and Jig-Saw! (1920). She returned to New York and performed in The Greenwich Village Follies in 1923–24.

Hollywood screen comedian

After a long career on stage and aged in her late thirties, Mack Sennett signed her with great fanfare in June 1927, describing her as an "internationally famous musical comedy and vaudeville star." She was cast in several "Sennett Girl Comedies," two-reel productions designed to show off the beauty of Sennett's latest actresses. Other actresses featured in the girl comedy shorts were Carole Lombard, Anita Barnes, and Kathryn Stanley. Her first title was The Girl from Everywhere, with Pollard receiving title billing. Some of these films included short, two-strip technicolor sequences. In these first movies for Sennett, Pollard demonstrated her talents as a comedian and dancer. Lombard and Pollard became close friends during the time they were working for Sennett. Lombard reportedly said "Daphne Pollard and I were just in hysterics the whole time. We used to pull the worst gags on...some of the boys."

Pollard went on to work for Vitaphone, RKO Pictures and Universal Pictures. She memorably appeared in several Laurel and Hardy films of the mid-1930s, as a shrewish wife of Oliver Hardy in Thicker than Water (1935) and Our Relations (1936) and also as a maid in Bonnie Scotland (1935), achieving almost 60 screen credits in the seven years between 1928 and 1935. She continued to appear in occasional supporting roles into the early 1940s, again appearing briefly with Laurel and Hardy in The Dancing Masters (1943). Her final role was as Mrs. McGinnis in Kid Dynamite (1943).

Personal life
In July 1911, aged 19, she married Ellington Strother Bunch, a journalist.

Pollard's parents and five of her siblings joined her in the US after 1911, settling in Seattle. An older sister, Hilda, who had married, stayed in Melbourne.

In early 1928, together with other former Pollard Lilliputan Opera Company members, she attended the Hollywood funeral of comedian Ted McNamara following his sudden death from pneumonia.

Daphne Pollard died in Los Angeles in 1978, aged 86.

Partial filmography

The Crossroads of New York (1922) - Minor Role
 The Girl from Everywhere (1927) - Minnie Stitch
Run, Girl, Run (1928, Short) - Coach Minnie Marmon
Love at First Flight (1928, Short) - Polly Polka - Dance Instructor
The Swim Princess (1928, Short) - Sally Forthe
Hit of the Show (1928) - The Slavey
The Good-Bye Kiss (1928) - Minor Role (uncredited)
The Girl from Nowhere (1928, Short) - Tillie Tucker - Wardrobe Mistress
The Campus Carmen (1928, Short) - Tillie Toober
Sinners in Love (1928) - Mabel
The Campus Vamp (1928, Short) - Dora
The Old Barn (1929, Short) - The School Teacher
Big Time (1929) - Sybil
South Sea Rose (1929) - Mrs. Nott
The Sky Hawk (1929) - Minnie
Loose Ankles (1930) - Agnes
Swing High (1930) - Mrs. May
America or Bust (1930, Short) - Arriet Emingway
What a Widow! (1930) - Masseuse
Bright Lights (1930) - Mame Avery
Divorced Sweethearts (1930, Short) - Aunt Louise
Don't Bite Your Dentist (1930, Short) - Mrs. Edward Martin
Help Wanted, Female (1931, Short) - Mrs. Hemingway
The Lady Refuses (1931) - Millie - Apartment House Maid
She Snoops to Conquer (1931, Short) - Daphne
Slide, Speedy, Slide (1931, Short) - Myrtle Brady
Crashing Reno (1931, Short)
Fast and Furious (1931, Short)
Oh! Marry Me (1931, Short)
Sold at Auction (1931, Short) - Daphne, the Working Girl
Straight Goods (1931, Short)
Monkey Shines (1932, Short)
Smoked Hams (1934, Short) - Emma Pollard
Thicker than Water (1935, Short) - Mrs. Daphne Hardy
Bonnie Scotland (1935) - Millie - the Maid
Our Relations (1936) - Mrs. Daphne Hardy
Tillie the Toiler (1941) - Mumsy Tomkins
Kid Dynamite (1943) - Mrs. McGinnis
The Dancing Masters (1943) - Mother at Dancing School (uncredited) (final film role)

See also
Fort Wayne Journal-Gazette, "The Littlest Soubrette On Broadway", Sunday, 4 July 1915, Page 8.
Los Angeles Times, "Bare Legs Catch Eye", 13 April 1914, Page III4.
Los Angeles Times, "Show World Review", 11 May 1916, Page II6.
Los Angeles Times, "Daphne Pollard With Sennett", 4 June 1927, Page A6.
Los Angeles Times, "Three Comedy Units Under Way at Sennett Studio", 17 July 1927, Page C11.
The New York Times, "Brooklyn Amusements", 4 October 1908, Page X2.
The New York Times, "Vaudeville", 18 April 1909, Page X8.
The New York Times, "News And Gossip of Vaudeville", 18 May 1924, Page X2.

References

External links

 
 

1890s births
1978 deaths
Actresses from Melbourne
Australian film actresses
Australian silent film actresses
Australian stage actresses
Vaudeville performers
Australian expatriate actresses in the United States
Burials at Forest Lawn Memorial Park (Hollywood Hills)
20th-century Australian actresses
19th-century Australian women